The R102 is a Regional Route in South Africa. It is the route designation for all old sections of the N2, thus it is a discontinuous road that resumes in areas where a new N2 has been constructed.

Route

Western Cape and Eastern Cape

In the Cape Town area, the R102 starts in the Central Business District and runs through Woodstock, Maitland, Goodwood and Parow before it reaches Bellville. From Bellville, it turns in a southeasterly direction and goes on the outskirts of the city through Kuils River, Eerste River and onwards to Somerset West where it merges with the existing N2.

At Mossel Bay it divides to the east again, passing through all the towns between there and George. Near Nature's Valley east of Plettenberg Bay it once again splits off, traversing the various Tsitsikamma gorges such as the Grootrivier Pass and the Bloukrans Pass (which is currently closed; was closed in 2007 due to flood damage) and then rejoining the N2 east of the Bloukrans Bridge. Farther east, in the Eastern Cape, it passes through the towns of Humansdorp and Jeffreys Bay, becoming the Van Stadens Pass and crossing the Gamtoos River and the Van Stadens River on its way to Gqeberha (previously Port Elizabeth), where it passes through the city centre before turning north and merging with the N2 at Coega.

At King William’s Town (7 km south-east of the town centre; at Zwelitsha), the R102 splits again for a short section, starting at a junction with the R346. It heads east-north-east through Phakamisa to Ilitha, where it turns eastwards just before a junction with the N2. It parallels the N2 east-south-east, through Berlin, passing a Walter Sisulu University campus, to form the northern border of the Mdantsane Township in East London. It then passes through the suburbs to the north of the CBD before rejoining the N2 north-east of the town (near Gonubie).

KwaZulu-Natal

The R102 separates from the N2 in Port Shepstone and passes through the South Coast towns of Anerley, Melville, Umzumbe and Hibberdene, before heading inland and passing through the Mnamfu area. It then turns back towards the coast and passes through Pennington, Park Rynie and Scottburgh before entering the Ethekwini Metropolitan Municipality (Durban Metropole) at Umkomaas. The route then passes through Kingsburgh and Amanzimtoti and then passes through the industrial suburbs of Prospecton, Mobeni and Congella before entering Durban's Central Business District from the south.

North of Durban, the route passes through Durban North and bypasses KwaMashu and Phoenix, then passes through Verulam and oThongathi (bypassing King Shaka International Airport before oThongathi), before heading towards Stanger (now KwaDukuza). After Stanger, the route heads through Darnall, Mandini and Gingindlovu, passes close to Mtunzini, before heading to Empangeni.

New section

As of 2018, there are plans to realign the N2 National Route from the city of Mthatha to the town of Port Shepstone, on a new route known as the Wild Coast Toll Route or Wild Coast Highway. The N2 will take over the entire section of the current R61 Route between the two cities, and turning that route into two lanes in each direction, providing a shorter and faster route through the Wild Coast.

So, as the N2 will be realigned, the old N2 route passing through KwaBhaca, Kokstad and Harding, just like most other old sections of the N2, may be designated as the R102 when the project is finished.

References

External links

 Routes Travel Info

Regional Routes in the Western Cape
Regional Routes in the Eastern Cape
Regional Routes in KwaZulu-Natal
Transport in Durban
Transport in Port Elizabeth
Roads in Cape Town